The 1963 Tour de Suisse was the 27th edition of the Tour de Suisse cycle race and was held from 13 June to 19 June 1963. The race started in Zürich and finished in Bremgarten. The race was won by Giuseppe Fezzardi of the Cynar team.

General classification

References

1963
Tour de Suisse